The S13 is a commuter rail route forming part of the Milan suburban railway service, which converges on the city of Milan, Italy.

The route runs over the infrastructure of the Milan Passante and Milan–Pavia–Voghera railways.  Like all but one of the other Milan suburban railway service routes, it is operated by Trenord.

Route 

  Milano Bovisa-Politecnico ↔ Milano Passante ↔ Pavia

Line S13, a cross-city route, heads initially in a southerly direction from Milano Bovisa-Politecnico through the Milan Passante railway to Milano Rogoredo.  From there, it turns southwest towards its southern terminus, Pavia.

History
The route was activated on 11 December 2011, to coincide with the introduction of the 2011/12 winter timetable.  It replaced the S10, which was simultaneously closed down.

Stations 
The stations on the S13 are as follows (the stations with a coloured background are within the municipality of Milan):

Scheduling 
, S13 trains ran at half-hourly intervals between 05:30 and 23:30 Monday to Friday, and at the same intervals on Saturdays and holidays between 06:00 and 19:00.

See also 

 History of rail transport in Italy
 List of Milan suburban railway stations
 Rail transport in Italy
 Transport in Milan

References

External links
 ATM – official site 
 Trenord – official site 
 Schematic of Line S13 – schematic depicting all stations on Line S13

This article is based upon a translation of the Italian language version as at November 2012.

Milan S Lines
2011 establishments in Italy